Maria Larsson (born 14 June 2000) is a Swedish curler from Stockholm. She currently plays lead on Team Isabella Wranå, also known as Team Panthera. With this team, she won a gold medal at the 2017 World Junior Curling Championships and a silver medal at the 2018 World Junior Curling Championships.

Career
Larsson qualified for her first World Junior Curling Championships in 2016, playing second on the Swedish team consisting of Therese Westman, Sarah Pengel, Mikaela Altebro and Johanna Heldin. At the 2016 World Junior Curling Championships, the team finished the round robin with a 5–4 record, qualifying for a tiebreaker. They then lost 10–4 in the tiebreaker to Hungary's Dorottya Palancsa, eliminating them from contention. At her next two appearances in 2017 and 2018, she was the alternate on Team Isabella Wranå. In 2017, the team made it all the way to the final and defeated Scotland's Sophie Jackson to win the gold medal, and lost just two round robin games in the process. The next year the same team went undefeated in the round robin, but ended up losing to Canada's Kaitlyn Jones in the final, settling for silver. At her fourth and final appearance in 2019 as lead for Tova Sundberg, the team placed sixth.

After the 2020–21 season lead of Team Wranå, Fanny Sjöberg, stepped back from competitive curling and Larsson replaced her as the teams new lead. The team had a successful first season together which started with reaching the final of the 2021 Euro Super Series in their first event. They also reached the semifinals of three more events, the 2021 Women's Masters Basel, the Red Deer Curling Classic and the International Bernese Ladies Cup. The team competed in three of the four Grand Slam of Curling events during the season, qualifying for the quarterfinals at both the 2021 National and the 2022 Players' Championship. Nationally, the team won the Swedish Eliteserien in February 2022 and later the Swedish Women's Curling Championship in March 2022.

Grand Slam record

Teams

References

External links

Swedish female curlers
Living people
2000 births
Sportspeople from Stockholm
People from Sundbyberg Municipality
Swedish curling champions
Place of birth missing (living people)
21st-century Swedish women